David William Tollner (born 31 January 1966) is an Australian politician. He was the Country Liberal Party member for Solomon in the Australian House of Representatives from 2001 to 2007, and then served in the Northern Territory Legislative Assembly as the member for Fong Lim from 2008 to 2016. He was the Deputy Chief Minister of the Northern Territory under chief minister Adam Giles from 2013 to 2014. During his time in federal parliament, he sat with the Liberal Party.

Early life and federal politics
Tollner was born in Biloela, Queensland, and worked as a manager and company director before entering politics. He contested the 1997 territory election as an independent, narrowly losing to CLP candidate Chris Lugg in the seat of Nelson. He subsequently won the new federal seat of Solomon for the CLP at the 2001 federal election, and was re-elected at the 2004 election. He was narrowly defeated by Labor candidate Damian Hale at the 2007 election.

Tollner sat with the Liberal Party in federal parliament during his time as member for Solomon.

Territory politics

|}
Tollner then contested the 2008 territory election, winning the new seat of Fong Lim and defeating Labor minister Matthew Bonson. He was re-elected at the 2012 election, and upon the CLP's victory was appointed Minister for Health, Minister for Alcohol Rehabilitation and Policy, and Minister for Housing. In March 2013, Mills expelled Tollner from his cabinet after a heated disagreement between the two at a party meeting. According to former MLA Daryl Manzie, Tollner swore at Mills and threw a stack of cabinet papers at him before walking out of the room.

Tollner was appointed deputy chief minister of the Northern Territory on 13 March 2013. He caused controversy in August 2014 when he referred to the gay son of fellow CLP MP Gary Higgins as a "pillow biter" and "shirt lifter". As a result, it was announced that Tollner's resignation as deputy leader of the CLP had been accepted. Despite that, Tollner said a few days later that he wanted to be restored to his former position or he would quit the party, leaving it in a precarious position on the floor of the Legislative Assembly. On 1 September, Chief Minister Adam Giles threw open the leadership and deputy leadership to a party room ballot. Giles was re-elected as CLP leader, and Peter Chandler was voted in as his deputy.

A redistribution ahead of the 2016 election all but erased Tollner's majority in Fong Lim, slashing it from a fairly safe 7.3 percent to an extremely marginal 0.2 percent.  Tollner tried to transfer to the newly created seat of Spillett, which had absorbed much of the eastern portion of Fong Lim.  However, he lost a November 2015 preselection battle to Lia Finocchiaro, the member for neighbouring Drysdale.  His senior advisor, Tim Dixon, was pre-selected for Fong Lim, but lost the seat to Labor.

Notes

External links
Personal website

1966 births
Living people
Deputy Chief Ministers of the Northern Territory
Country Liberal Party members of the Parliament of Australia
Members of the Australian House of Representatives
Members of the Australian House of Representatives for Solomon
Members of the Northern Territory Legislative Assembly
People from Biloela
Country Liberal Party members of the Northern Territory Legislative Assembly
21st-century Australian politicians
Liberal Party of Australia members of the Parliament of Australia